More About Nostradamus is a 1941 American short film directed by David Miller. In 1941 it was nominated for an Academy Award at the 13th Academy Awards for Best Live Action Short Film, One-Reel.

Cast
 John Burton as Michel de Nostradamus
 Hans Conried as Feliz Paretti later Pope Sixtus V
 James Dime as Grave Digger
 John George as Townsman

References

External links

1941 films
1941 short films
1940s biographical films
1940s English-language films
Films directed by David Miller
American black-and-white films
Metro-Goldwyn-Mayer short films
American biographical films
Cultural depictions of Nostradamus
1940s American films